Kongasso (also spelled Kongaso) is a town in central Ivory Coast. It is a sub-prefecture and commune of Kounahiri Department in Béré Region, Woroba District.
In 2014, the population of the sub-prefecture of Kongasso was 35,642.

Villages
The eighteen villages of the sub-prefecture of Kongasso and their population in 2014 are:

Notes

Sub-prefectures of Béré Region
Communes of Béré Region